The siege of Fort Saint Philip can refer to several different battles:

Siege of Fort St. Phillip (1756) - a siege during the Seven Years' War
Siege of Fort St. Philip (1781) -  a Siege during the Spanish invasion of Minorca in the American War of Independence
Siege of Fort St. Philip (1815) - an action in Louisiana during the War of 1812
Battle of Forts Jackson and St. Philip - a naval engagement in Louisiana during the American Civil War